Jacob Christian Hansen-Ellehammer (14 June 1871 – 20 May 1946) was a Danish watchmaker and inventor born in Bakkebølle, Denmark. He is remembered chiefly for his contributions to powered flight.

 Following the end of his apprenticeship as a watchmaker, he moved to Copenhagen where he worked as an electronics mechanic before establishing his own company in 1898. In the beginning he produced cigarette machines, beverage machines and other electronic machinery. In 1904 he produced his first motorcycle, the Elleham motorcycle. The Elleham motorcycle is of step-tru type with the engine situated beneath the seating, thus predating the Vespa scooter by 40 years.

In 1903–1904 Jacob Hansen-Ellehammer used his experience constructing motorcycles fitted with single-cylinder Peugeot Frères engines to build the world's first air-cooled radial engine, a three-cylinder engine by utilizing Peugeot Frères cylinders and heads in a home-cast engine block.
The initial engine soon proved too weak and homemade cylinders with a larger volume were fitted on an even bigger block which eventually brought him into the air.
The original engine wasn't abandoned but saved for later use, which eventually happened when he had a flirt with helicopters. The helicopter experiments are known and photographically documented, but late in the century a down-scaled model of his helicopter was found deep in storage and it had a relatively small three-cylinder radial engine fitted which is considered being reuse of his original engine, hence the first functioning radial engine still exists and is displayed at the Danish Museum of Science & Technology in Helsingør. The engine is started up on a daily basis.

The know-how from the three-cylinder was used as the basis for a yet more powerful five-cylinder model in 1907. This was installed in his triplane and made a number of short free-flight hops as mentioned below.

In 1905, he constructed a monoplane, and in the following year a "semi-biplane". In this latter machine, he made a tethered flight on 12 September 1906. Hansen-Ellehammer's later inventions included a successful triplane and helicopter. His helicopter was a coaxial machine. A famous photo shows it hovering in 1914, though there is no evidence that it was successful in achieving horizontal flight. Hansen-Ellehammer later studied a disc-rotor configuration - a compound helicopter with coaxial blades that extended from the hub for hover, and retracted for high speed vertical flight. Although a wind tunnel model was constructed, there's no evidence that anything more was studied.
The initial experiments was done on a circular track attached to a central pole and constructed on a small island quite distant from Copenhagen where he lived by his workshop construction motorcycles and numerous devices. Once experiencing the first short lift offs he found time had come to move flight experiments close to Copenhagen. However, with the workshop not located to the given 'airstrips' used he was forced to incorporate a folding wing for collapsing his second aircraft during transport out of town.

As the first design was quite kite-like with the pilot and engine hanging separately to balance the aircraft, Hansen-Ellehammer invented the UL-type motorised hang glider and the detail of foldable wings was probably decades prior to any other as the contemporary aircraft was rigid boxkite like biplanes.

In 1986, Hansen-Ellehammer was inducted into the International Air & Space Hall of Fame at the San Diego Air & Space Museum.

See also
Early flying machines

References

The Early Years (Aviation Century), 2003, Ron Dick, Amanda Wright Lane, Dan Patterson, Boston Mills Press, 
Wings: A History of Aviation from Kites to the Space Age, 2004, Tom D. Crouch, W. W. Norton & Company, 
100 Years of Flight: A Chronology of Aerospace History, 1903-2003 (Library of Flight Series), 2003,  Frank H. Winter, F. Robert Van Der Linden, AIAA, 
Jeg Flöj (I flew), 1931, Autobiography J.Ellehammer, Copenhagen Drengebladet publishing,

External links
Ellehammer A/S founded by J.C.H. Ellehammer in 1904 - Today producing ejectors and pump systems for the maritime industry

1871 births
1946 deaths
Danish aviators
20th-century Danish inventors
Aviation pioneers
People from Vordingborg Municipality
Burials at Hellerup Cemetery